A roll trailer is a trailer platform that requires towing by a powered vehicle. It is commonly used for the transport of heavy static goods and materials in the maritime shipping industry. Roll trailers are similar to shipping flat racks containers, however, they have a set of rear wheels.

Overview
Roll trailers are a common equipment used in ports and on board of roll-on/roll-off ships, to facilitate the shipping of unmovable commodities and oversize load from one port to another.

The standard payloads of roll trailers are 80 or 100 tons, and the tare of the trailer varies from 7 to 10 tons.

The trailer has a steel structure and a hardwood surface, plus a front pocket for towing by tugmaster gooseneck, and side handles for applying lashing hooks.

Operations
Goods are usually placed on roll trailers by forklift or shore crane, secured with lashing or chains, and then towed on/off board via tugmaster tractor. When empty, they can be stacked like shipping containers.

Every trailer has a unique identification number stamped on sides, composed of four letters and seven digits, directly related to the manufacturer company abbreviation name, the payload capacity and its length size.

All the main shipping lines have an owned fleet of roll trailers available to be offered to shippers for moving heavy static cargo.
Additionally, all main roll trailers manufacturers tend to lease extra equipment during peak times, by charging a daily hire fee to the shipping lines.

Once in the port, after a short "free time" period, roll trailers are subject to demurrage charges, to cover storage and detention fees and to ensure consignees swiftly unload their cargo, temporary positioned on the shipping line's trailers during the sea passage.
As per standard practice, and opposite to shipping containers, roll trailers are not permitted to exit the ports, with receivers requested to collect their goods inside the terminals.

Gallery

See also 
 Terminal tractor

References

Trailers
Articulated vehicles
Freight transport